Clifton Smith, Jr. (born July 4, 1985) is a former American football running back and return specialist who played in the National Football League (NFL), Canadian Football League (CFL) and United Football League (UFL).  He played college football for Fresno State.  He was signed by the Tampa Bay Buccaneers of the NFL as an undrafted free agent in 2008, and has also played for the NFL's Miami Dolphins and Cleveland Browns.

Professional career

Tampa Bay Buccaneers
Smith was signed by the Tampa Bay Buccaneers as an undrafted free agent following the 2008 NFL Draft on May 5, 2008. He was waived during final cuts on August 30, but was re-signed to the team's practice squad on September 1. He was promoted to the active roster on October 25. In week 9 of the 2008 NFL season in a game against the Kansas City Chiefs, Smith took a kickoff return for a touchdown for 97 yards for just the second time in Buccaneer history. In week 12 of the 2008 NFL season in a game against the Detroit Lions, Smith took a punt return for a touchdown  for 70 yards. On December 16, 2008, Smith was named to his first career Pro Bowl as the NFC's return specialist.

During an October 18, 2009 game against the Carolina Panthers, Smith suffered a concussion as a result of being rammed into by Panthers cornerback Dante Wesley while awaiting a punt return.  The Panthers received a 15-yard penalty and Wesley was ejected from the game. Smith was placed on injured reserve on December 8, 2009, due to a second concussion.

He was re-signed on May 4, 2010 to a restricted free agent tender. On September 5, after claiming running back Kregg Lumpkin off waivers from the Green Bay Packers, the Buccaneers released Smith.

Miami Dolphins
On September 7, 2010, Smith signed with  the Miami Dolphins. He was released on September 21.

Cleveland Browns
Smith was signed by the Cleveland Browns on November 16, 2010. He was released on December 1.

Virginia Destroyers
Smith was signed by the Virginia Destroyers of the United Football League on June 7, 2011.

Calgary Stampeders
Smith was signed by the Calgary Stampeders of the Canadian Football League on September 14, 2013. Smith was activated from the practice roster October 11, 2013 and suited up for his first CFL game against the BC Lions. He made an instant contribution returning the opening kickoff 54 yards. Smith scored his first CFL touchdown in the third quarter on a 6-yard pass from Kevin Glenn. He was released by the Stampeders on November 18, 2013.

Personal
Smith's younger brother, Brandon Breazell, was a wide receiver at UCLA. Smith also has two sisters, Nichole and Brianna Smith. His parents' names are Roxanne Wright and Clifton Smith, Sr. In his spare time, Smith has said that he enjoys playing video games, sleeping and buying shoes. On his Fresno State biography, Smith lists his favorite athlete as Deion Sanders.

Smith often goes by the nickname "Peanut", used extensively by both teammates and fans.

References

External links
Just Sports Stats
Fresno State Bulldogs bio

1985 births
Living people
Sportspeople from Fresno, California
American football cornerbacks
American football running backs
American football return specialists
Cleveland Browns players
Fresno State Bulldogs football players
Tampa Bay Buccaneers players
Miami Dolphins players
National Conference Pro Bowl players
Players of American football from California
Virginia Destroyers players